Kashkarovo (Qaşqar) is a rural locality (a village) in Miyakibashevsky Selsoviet, Miyakinsky District, Bashkortostan, Russia. The population was 58 as of 2010. There are 2 streets.

Geography 
Kashkarovo is located 27 km east of Kirgiz-Miyaki (the district's administrative centre) by road. Urshakbashkaramaly is the nearest rural locality.

References 

Rural localities in Miyakinsky District